Madhu Guruswamy is an Indian actor. He predominantly acts in the Kannada  and Telugu film industries.

Early life and career 

After taking acting lessons at Abhinaya Tharanga, Madhu Guruswamy spent a few years in theater.  He was very fond of theater work and did several stage shows  Madhu Guruswamy started his career as a theater actor and gained popularity with Bajrangi. Madhu Guruswamy's first movie was Deadly-2 in which he also worked as an assistant director.

Filmography

Awards and nominations

References

External links

 
 
 

Living people
Male actors in Kannada cinema
Indian male film actors
Indian actor-politicians
1986 births
21st-century Indian male actors
Male actors from Bangalore